Magdalena Maleeva was the defending champion, but did not compete this year.

Martina Müller won the title by defeating Myriam Casanova 6–2, 3–6, 6–4 in the final.

This was the last professional tournament for Miroslava Vavrinec (Roger Federer's wife) until retiring at the same year due to injuries. Vavrinec competed at the qualifying rounds, losing in the first round to Magdalena Zděnovcová in straight sets.

Seeds

Draw

Finals

Top half

Bottom half

Qualifying

Qualifying seeds

Qualifiers

Lucky losers

Qualifying draw

First qualifier

Second qualifier

Third qualifier

Fourth qualifier

References

External links
 Official results archive (ITF)
 Official results archive (WTA)

Budapest Grand Prix - Singles
Budapest Grand Prix